Port Vale F.C. is an English professional association football club based in Burslem, Stoke-on-Trent, Staffordshire, who play in , as of the  season. The club was formed in the 1870s, in 1884 they took the name Burslem Port Vale F.C., dropping the 'Burslem' in 1907. They played their home matches at The Old Recreation Ground between 1912 and 1950 and at Vale Park from 1950 to the present day. The club joined the English Football League in 1892 as founder members of the Football League Second Division, resigning in 1907, only to return in 1919. Vale's highest league finish was fifth in the Second Division in 1930–31, whilst they were FA Cup semi-finalists in 1953–54. They competed in Europe in the Anglo-Italian Cup on one occasion and would go on to reach the final, losing 5–2 to Italian club Genoa on 17 March 1996.

Port Vale have won four promotions out of the third tier, going up as champions in 1929–30 and 1953–54, and have won five promotions out of the fourth tier, being crowned champions in 1958–59. They have lifted the Football League Trophy twice, in 1993 and 2001. Two club records are also Football League records: most clean sheets in a season (30 in 46 Third Division North matches in the 1953–54 season) and biggest league defeat (0–10 against Sheffield United on 10 December 1892). Roy Sproson made 842 appearances (760 in the league) for Vale between 1950 and 1972, later becoming manager from January 1974 to October 1977. Wilf Kirkham is the club's record goalscorer with 164 goals in all competitions over two spells between 1923 and 1933, and set the record for most Football League goals in a single season with 38 in the 1926–27 campaign. Gareth Ainsworth is the player Vale have both received and spent the highest sum on in the transfer market: £500,000 was given to Lincoln City in September 1997 and £2 million received from Wimbledon as he departed in October 1998. All top five transfers either in or out were made in the 1990s, before the Bosman ruling and the departure of highly successful manager John Rudge. Chris Birchall is the club record international cap holder with three goals in 27 appearances playing for Trinidad and Tobago between 2001 and 2006, including three appearances in the 2006 World Cup.

Honours and achievements

Football League
Football League Third Division / Third Division North / League One (3rd tier)
Champions: 1929–30, 1953–54
2nd place promotion: 1993–94
Play-off winners: 1988–89

Football League Fourth Division / Third Division / League Two (4th tier)
Champions: 1958–59
3rd place promotion: 1982–83, 2012–13
4th place promotion: 1969–70, 1985–86
Play-off winners: 2021–22

Football League Trophy
Winners: 1993, 2001

Others

North Staffordshire & District League
Champions: 1909–10

The Central League
Runners–up: 1911–12

Anglo-Italian Cup
Runners–up: 1996

Debenhams Cup
Runners–up: 1977

Staffordshire Senior Cup
Winners: 1898, 1912, 1920, 1947, 1949, 1953, 2001
Runners–up: 1900, 1928, 1930, 1948, 1973, 2010, 2014

Birmingham Senior Cup
Winners: 1913
Runners–up: 1899, 1900, 1914

Staffordshire Junior Cup
Winners: 1910

North Staffordshire Charity Challenge Cup
Winners: 1883, 1885, 1891
Runners–up: 1886

Staffordshire Senior Charity Cup
Winners: 1892, 1897

North Staffordshire Infirmary Cup
Winners: 1915, 1920, 1922
Runners–up: 1921, 1923, 1924, 1927, 1930, 1932

Burslem Challenge Cup
Winners: 1885

Hanley Cup
Runners–up: 1910

Coronation Cup
Runners–up: 1953

Supporters' Clubs' Trophy
Winners: 1961
Runners–up: 1960

Notes

Player records

Youngest first team player: Jack Shorrock, 15 years 145 days (against Shrewsbury Town, 20 September 2022).
Oldest first team player: Tom Holford, 46 years 68 days, (against Derby County, 5 April 1924).
Youngest first team goalscorer: Clint Boulton, 17 years 110 days (against Walsall, 26 April 1965).
Tallest first team player: Tomáš Holý, .
Most goals in a season: Joe Brough, 43 goals in the 1909–10 season.
Most Football League goals in a season: Wilf Kirkham, 38 goals in Second Division in the 1926–27 season.
Most club top-scoring seasons: Wilf Kirkham, 6 (1924–25, 1925–26, 1926–27, 1927–28, 1928–29, 1932–33)
Most goals in a Football League match: 6, Stewart Littlewood (against Chesterfield, 24 September 1932).
Most goals in any match: 7, Chris Young (against Burton Rangers, Birmingham Senior Cup First Round, 21 September 1914).
Longest consecutive scoring run: 8, John Rowland (1 September to 4 October 1965) & Basil Hayward (28 November 1953 to 26 January 1954).
Most competitive hat-tricks: Wilf Kirkham, 13.
Quickest competitive goal: 5 seconds, Ian Bogie (against Stoke City), 12 March 1996.
Quickest competitive hat-trick: 3 minutes, Fred Mitcheson (against Plymouth Argyle), 21 April 1934.
Most successful penalty-taker: Andy Jones, 20 from 23.
Most penalties in a season: Andy Jones, 12 from 15 in the 1986–87 season.
Most red cards: Jason Talbot, 5.
Most clean sheets in a season: 29, Ray King, 1953–54.
Most international caps while a Port Vale player: Chris Birchall, 27 for Trinidad and Tobago
Most international goals while a Port Vale player: Chris Birchall, 3 for Trinidad and Tobago
First Port Vale player to appear in the World Cup finals: Chris Birchall, for Trinidad and Tobago against Sweden on 10 June 2006
Most appearances by a Port Vale player in the World Cup finals: Chris Birchall, three appearances for Trinidad and Tobago at the 2006 World Cup.
Most consecutive appearances: John Nicholson, 208 (2 September 1961 – 8 September 1965).
Most goals at Vale Park: Tom Pope, 64.
Most Port Vale F.C. Player of the Year awards: Tom Pope, 3 (2013, 2014 & 2018).
Longest time between appearances: Will Atkinson, 11 years and 11 months (6 November 2007 – 5 October 2019).

Appearances

Most appearances

Goalscorers

Transfer fees

Paid

Record progression

Received

Record progression

PFA Team of the Year
The following players have been included in the PFA Team of the Year whilst playing at the club:
 1981–82:  Mark Chamberlain (Fourth Division)
 1982–83:  Phil Sproson,  Russell Bromage,  Steve Fox (Fourth Division)
 1984–85:  Russell Bromage (Fourth Division)
 1985–86:  Phil Sproson (Fourth Division)
 1987–88:  Ray Walker (Third Division)
 1988–89:  Ray Walker (Third Division)
 1992–93:  Peter Swan,  Ray Walker,  Ian Taylor (Second Division)
 1993–94:  Neil Aspin,  Dean Glover,  Ian Taylor (Second Division)
 2012–13:  Jennison Myrie-Williams,  Tom Pope (League Two)

International caps
The following players have won full senior international whilst playing at the club:

Club records

Most Football League goals scored in a season: 110 in 46 matches, Fourth Division, 1958–59.
Fewest Football League goals scored in a season: 30 in 22 matches, Second Division, 1892–93.
Fewest Football League goals conceded in a season: 21 in 46 matches, Third Division North, 1953–54.
Most Football League goals conceded in a season: 106 in 42 matches, Second Division, 1935–36.
Fewest Football League goals conceded at home in a season: 5 in 23 matches, Third Division North, 1953–54.
Most points in a Football League season: 89 in 46 matches, Second Division 1992–93.
Fewest points in a Football League season: 15 in 22 matches, Second Division, 1892–93.
Most wins in a Football League season: 30 in 42 matches, Third Division North, 1929–30.
Fewest wins in a Football League season: 6 in 22 matches, Second Division, 1892–93.
Fewest defeats in a Football League season: 3 in 46 matches, Third Division North, 1953–54.
Most defeats in a Football League season: 28 in 42 matches, Second Division, 1956–57.
Most draws in a Football League season: 20 in 46 matches, 1977–78
Fewest draws in a Football League season: 3 in 22 matches, 1892–93
Most red cards in a season: 7 in 46 games, 1974–75 & 2001–02
Most clean sheets in a season: 30 in 46 matches, Third Division North, 1953–54
Most players used in a season: 43 in 1998–99

Streaks
League wins: 8, 8 April 1893 to 30 September 1893
Draws: 6, 26 April 1981 to 12 September 1981
Losses: 9, 9 March 1957 to 20 April 1957
Clean sheets: 7, 11 February 1922 to 18 March 1922
Without a win: 17, 7 December 1991 to 21 March 1992
Without a draw: 20, 10 September 1906 to 19 January 1907 & 30 October 2004 to 5 March 2005
Without a loss: 19, 5 May 1969 to 8 November 1969
Without a clean sheet: 22, 22 September 1956 to 23 February 1957
Without failing to score: 22, 12 September 1992 to 13 February 1993
Without scoring a goal: 6, 19 August 2017 to 12 September 2017

Home
Wins: 12, 9 February 1952 to 8 September 1952
Draws: 6, 10 October 1977 to 27 December 1977 & 20 January 1982 to 6 March 1982
Losses: 6, 1 January 1992 to 14 March 1992 & 26 December 2018 to 19 February 2019
Clean sheets: 11, 7 September 1953 to 13 February 1954
Failing to score: 5, 13 April 1998 to 31 August 1998
Without a win: 12, 28 March 1978 to 21 October 1978
Without a draw: 19, 25 August 1928 to 6 April 1929
Without a loss: 42, 8 November 1952 to 18 September 1954
Without a clean sheet: 13, 26 September 1964 to 15 March 1965
Without failing to score: 33, 19 October 1946 to 13 March 1948

Away
Wins: 5, 20 March 1993 to 24 April 1993
Draws: 6, 20 March 1954 to 26 April 1954 & 19 January 1985 to 29 March 1985
Losses: 14, 21 September 1895 to 18 April 1896
Clean sheets: 5, 20 March 1993 to 24 April 1993
Failing to score: 6, 8 January 1966 to 9 March 1966
Without a win: 29, 17 January 1903 to 8 October 1904
Without a draw: 27, 26 January 1895 to 3 December 1898
Without a loss: 10, 5 May 1969 to 8 November 1969
Without a clean sheet: 42, 18 December 1976 to 30 September 1978
Without failing to score: 15, 10 January 1998 to 26 September 1998

Matches

Record win: 16–0 against Middlewich in a friendly, 2 February 1884.
Record away win: 9–0 at Smallthorne in North Staffs & District League, 26 February 1910.
Record Football League win: 9–1 against Chesterfield in Second Division, 24 September 1932.
Record defeat: 0–12 at Aston Villa in Staffordshire Senior Cup, 26 January 1891.
Record Football League defeat: 0–10 against Sheffield United in Second Division, 10 December 1892.
Record aggregate score: 12 (3–9) at Tottenham Hotspur, 21 November 1931.
Record aggregate cup score: 9 (2–7) at Aston Villa, 10 January 1925.
Highest home attendance: 49,768 against Aston Villa, FA Cup fifth round, 20 February 1960.
Highest Football League attendance: 40,066 against Stoke City, Second Division, 25 April 1955.
Highest home gate receipts: £170,349: against Everton, FA Cup fourth round, 14 February 1996.
Highest average home attendance: 20,708 in 1954–55
Lowest (competitive first team) attendance at Vale Park: 554 against Middlesbrough U21, EFL Trophy Group Stage, 16 October 2018.
Lowest Football League attendance at Vale Park: 1,924 against York City, 1 May 1982.
Notes

European statistics

Record by season

Record by opposition nationality

References
General

 Kent, Jeff: "The Valiants' Years: The Story of Port Vale" (Witan Books, 1990).
 Kent, Jeff: "The Port Vale Record 1879–1993" (Witan Books, 1993).
 Kent, Jeff: "Port Vale Personalities: A Biographical Dictionary of Players, Officials and Supporters" (Witan Books, 1996).

Specific

Port Vale F.C.
Records